Myriam Da Silva (born April 15, 1984) is a Canadian boxer. Da Silva competes in the 69 kg (welterweight category).

Career
Da Silva has competed at four editions of the AIBA Women's World Boxing Championships, finishing in the top 16 in 2012 and 2014, and then followed by a quarterfinals position in 2018 and again a top 16 in 2019.

In 2019, Da Silva competed at the 2019 Pan American Games in Lima, Peru. Da Silva won the silver medal after losing to Oshae Jones in the final.

In May 2021, Da Silva was named to Canada's 2020 Olympic team.

References

1984 births
Canadian women boxers
Living people
Boxers at the 2019 Pan American Games
People from Chambly, Quebec
Pan American Games silver medalists for Canada
Pan American Games medalists in boxing
Boxers at the 2020 Summer Olympics
Olympic boxers of Canada
Medalists at the 2019 Pan American Games